Serrungarina is a frazione of the comune of Colli al Metauro in the Province of Pesaro e Urbino in the Italian region Marche, located about  northwest of Ancona and about  south of Pesaro. It was a separate commune until 1 January 2017.
 

Cities and towns in the Marche